James A. O'Flaherty (July 26, 1942 – July 20, 2001) was an Irish folk musician who lived in the Dallas, Texas area.  He was born in Listowel, County Kerry, Ireland, moving to Texas at 29.  He raised a family of ten children in Corinth, Texas, and died on July 20, 2001.

The O'Flaherty Irish folk Music Retreat' was established in late 2004 in his name.

The first retreat was featured in the Dallas Morning News. The retreat attendance was more than twice the expected attendance and supported by a guest performer from Ireland, Seamus Connolly.

O'Flaherty is the father of film director and award-winning video game veteran Jerry O'Flaherty.

References

1942 births
2001 deaths
Musicians from County Kerry
People from Listowel
Irish folk musicians
People from Denton County, Texas